Mirny (lit. peaceful; , Miiriney) is a town and the administrative center of Mirninsky District in the Sakha Republic, Russia, located on the Irelyakh River (Vilyuy's basin),  west of Yakutsk, the capital of the republic. As of the 2010 Census, its population was 37,188.

History
Mirny was founded in 1955 after the discovery of a nearby kimberlite pipe by an expedition led by Yury Khabardin. Town status was granted to it in 1959.

Administrative and municipal status
Within the framework of administrative divisions, Mirny serves as the administrative center of Mirninsky District. As an inhabited locality, Mirny is classified as a town under republic jurisdiction. As an administrative division, it is incorporated within Mirninsky District as the Town of Mirny. As a municipal division, the Town of Mirny is incorporated within Mirninsky Municipal District as Mirny Urban Settlement.

Economy
The Mir mine is located within the town. Production was stopped in 2004, and the mine was permanently closed in 2011, due to reduced recovery and the costs of working in the far northern climate.

Transportation
The town is served by the Mirny Airport. Safety concerns have been raised about aircraft operations near to the open diamond mine; helicopters are forbidden to pass over the abandoned workings.

Education
The Mirny Polytechnic Institute, a branch of the North-Eastern Federal University, operates in the town.

References

Notes

Sources
Official website of the Sakha Republic. Registry of the Administrative-Territorial Divisions of the Sakha Republic. Mirninsky District.

External links
Official website of Mirny 

Cities and towns in the Sakha Republic
Cities and towns built in the Soviet Union
Populated places established in 1955
1955 establishments in Russia